Edward Cronk (born 5 June 1936) is a British sprint canoer who competed in the early 1960s. At the 1960 Summer Olympics in Rome, he was eliminated in the semifinals of the K-1 4 × 500 m event.

References
Sports-reference.com profile

1936 births
Canoeists at the 1960 Summer Olympics
Living people
Olympic canoeists of Great Britain
British male canoeists